The 1916 Arizona gubernatorial election took place on November 7, 1916, for the post of the Governor of Arizona. Due to battles between labor and business, the Hunt administration was facing severe electoral backlash. After facing a fairly strong primary by former Council member George Olney, Hunt prevailed and went on to face the closest election in Arizona gubernatorial history. The initial results of the 1916 election were extremely close, with Campbell winning by only 30 votes.

Victory hinged on whether to count certain votes. Arizona then had a ballot where voters could check a party column ballot signifying they voted for all of a party. Some voters did that for the Democratic Party column, but then also checked for Republican challenger Thomas Campbell,  leading to a court battle over the interpretation of whether those votes were valid or not. All ballots that were marked as straight Democrat and Hunt, were originally counted for Campbell giving him the 30 vote majority.

Thomas E. Campbell was sworn in as governor on January 1, 1917, but Hunt refused to leave office. The state Supreme Court ruled that Campbell should serve as the de facto governor until the legal issues were resolved and so Hunt stepped down on the 27th. After losing a case in the Maricopa County Superior Court in May, Hunt appealed to the state Supreme Court. On December 22, the state Supreme Court  declared that Hunt had won by 43 votes. Hunt took office again on Christmas of 1917, after the court ruled unanimously in his favor. Campbell served nearly an entire year as governor. This would be the last election in which Hunt would run until 1922.

Democratic primary

Candidates
George W. P. Hunt, incumbent governor
George A. Olney, former Arizona Territorial Council member

Results

General election

Results

References

Bibliography

1916
Arizona
Gubernatorial
November 1916 events